Lara Kramer is a Canadian dancer and artist. Kramer lives and works on territory of the Kanien'kahá:ka Nation. She is Oji-Cree (Ojibwe and Cree) and she closely links her work to memory, examining issues of social, political and cultural importance for Canada and First Nations Peoples.

Her work Native Girl Syndrome (NGS) was well received and deals with her family's history and experiences of Canadian Indian Residential Schools. NGS brings audiences into a space of feeling and remembering the impact of colonial violence on Indigenous young women. In addition to NGS, she has created several feature length performance pieces such as This Time Will Be Different, Tame, Of Good Moral Character, Fragments, which explore family and personal, complex, multilayered experiences, including from the Pelican Lake Indian Residential School and street life. Kramer intended these experiences to speak to assimilation, cultural disorientation, confinement, survival, and human connection. Her works have been presented in Montreal, Ottawa, Peterborough, Toronto, Regina, Edmonton, Banff and Vancouver, gaining her recognition as an important Indigenous voice in Canada. She has been an artist-in-residence across Canada and in Australia, and faculty of the Indigenous Dance Residency at the Banff Centre.

In 2018, Lara Kramer was recipient of the Canada Council for the Arts Jacqueline Lemieux Prize for outstanding contributions in dance.

Education 

Lara Kramer graduated with a BFA in Contemporary Dance from Concordia University, Montréal (2008).

Creations 
 Phantom, stills & vibrations, 2018
This time will be different, 2017
 Tame, 2015
 Native Girl Syndrome, (NGS) 2013
 Of good moral character, 2011
 Fragments, 2009
 "The Indian Problem," 2008

References 

Place of birth missing (living people)
Living people
Year of birth missing (living people)
21st-century Canadian dancers
21st-century First Nations people
Canadian female dancers
Concordia University alumni
First Nations dancers
Oji-Cree people